Soppeng Regency is a landlocked regency in South Sulawesi province of Indonesia. Soppeng Regency has its seat of government (capital) in the town of Watansoppeng, located 180 km from Makassar. The regency covers an area of 1,557 km2, and had a population of 223,826 at the 2010 Census and 235,167 at the 2020 Census; the official estimate as at mid 2021 was 235,574.

History 
The regency covers the area of the former Bugis kingdom of Soppeng, of which Watansoppeng was the capital, set among rolling foothills on the western edge of the fertile Walanae Valley, which runs north to Lake Tempe.

Administration 
Soppeng Regency in 2020 (as in 2010) comprised eight administrative Districts (Kecamatan), tabulated below with their areas and their populations at the 2010 Census and the 2020 Census, together with the official estimates as at mid 2021. The table also includes the locations of the district administrative centres, and the number of administrative villages (rural desa and urban kelurahan) in each district, and its post code.

See also 

 List of regencies and cities of Indonesia

References

External links 

  

Regencies of South Sulawesi